The Park Theatre in Estes Park, Colorado was built in 1913, and is the oldest operating cinema in the western United States. Designed by Clyde Anderson, it features an  neon-outlined tower, added by Ralph Gwynn in 1922.

See also
National Register of Historic Places listings in Larimer County, Colorado

References

External links

Park Theatre

Estes Park, Colorado
Theatres on the National Register of Historic Places in Colorado
Neoclassical architecture in Colorado
Theatres completed in 1913
Buildings and structures in Larimer County, Colorado
Cinemas and movie theaters in Colorado
1913 establishments in Colorado
National Register of Historic Places in Larimer County, Colorado